Lümandu is a village in Kohila Parish, Rapla County in northwestern Estonia.

References

 

Villages in Rapla County
Kreis Harrien